Yamil Rodrigo Asad (born 27 July 1994) is an Argentine professional footballer who plays as an attacking midfielder for Major League Soccer club D.C. United.

Club career

Vélez Sarsfield 
Asad played youth football and debuted professionally with Vélez Sarsfield under Ricardo Gareca's coaching, entering the field in a 1–2 defeat to Colón in the 2013 Final. Asad was part of the squad that won the 2013 Supercopa Argentina, although he did not play the game.

After Héctor Canteros' departure from the club and Jorge Correa's injury, Asad started playing more regularly for the first team under José Oscar Flores' coaching in the 2014 Argentine Primera División, totaling 14 games (5 as a starter). Under Miguel Ángel Russo's coaching, Asad scored his first professional goal, in a 2–1 victory over Crucero del Norte.

Atlanta United 

On 11 January 2017, Asad was loaned to Major League Soccer's Atlanta United FC. He scored the first goal in the team's MLS history, against New York Red Bulls in a 1–2 defeat at home on 5 March 2017. Despite a successful season with Atlanta, the club was unable to agree terms with Vélez Sarsfield on a permanent move and Asad returned to the Argentine club. However, MLS roster rules dictated that Atlanta maintained his rights within MLS.

D.C. United 
In February 2018, a three-way transaction was struck between Vélez Sarsfield, Atlanta United, and D.C. United which resulted in Asad signing on loan for D.C. In the deal, D.C. sent $300,000 in general allocation money and $200,000 in targeted allocation money to Atlanta for Asad's MLS future. At the same time, D.C. reached a loan agreement for 2018 with Vélez Sarsfield which included a purchase option of $700,000 at season's end. In his debut for D.C. United against Orlando City SC on March 3, 2018, Asad scored his first goal for the team in the 32nd minute. Asad scored again in the Audi Field inaugural game against the Vancouver Whitecaps on 14 July 2018. The game ended as a 3–1 win for United. Asad scored 9 goals and contributed 8 assists in 2018 for D.C. United.

D.C. United pursued to permanently sign Asad after the 2018 season, but talks fell and Asad decided to return to Vélez Sarsfield.

Return to Vélez Sarsfield 
Asad decided to return to Vélez Sarsfield in January 2019.

Return to D.C. United 
On 17 September 2019, Asad signed a pre-contract agreement with D.C. United for the 2020 Major League Soccer Season. Asad scored his first goal for D.C. United since his return on 7 March 2020, in a 2–1 win against Inter Miami. Following the 2021 season, Asad was released by D.C. United.

International career
Due to his background, he is available to play for either Argentina, Syria and Lebanon.

Personal life
Yamil Asad is the son of former Vélez Sarsfield player Omar Asad, who scored the second goal for Vélez in the 2–0 win over A.C. Milan for the 1994 Intercontinental Cup, the same year of Yamil's birth. He is also great-nephew of former international footballer and manager Julio Asad. Asad was nicknamed "El Turco" due to his Syrian/Lebanese ethnicity.

Career Statistics

Club

Honours 
Vélez Sarsfield
 Supercopa Argentina: 2013

References

External links
 Profile at Vélez Sarsfield's official website 
 Argentine Primera statistics at Fútbol XXI 

Living people
1994 births
Footballers from Buenos Aires
Association football midfielders
Argentine footballers
Argentine expatriate footballers
Argentine people of Syrian descent
Argentine people of Lebanese descent
Sportspeople of Lebanese descent
Argentine Primera División players
Major League Soccer players
Club Atlético Vélez Sarsfield footballers
Atlanta United FC players
D.C. United players
Expatriate soccer players in the United States